Events from the year 1757 in Wales.

Incumbents
Lord Lieutenant of North Wales (Lord Lieutenant of Anglesey, Caernarvonshire, Flintshire, Merionethshire, Montgomeryshire) – George Cholmondeley, 3rd Earl of Cholmondeley 
Lord Lieutenant of Glamorgan – Other Windsor, 4th Earl of Plymouth
Lord Lieutenant of Brecknockshire and Lord Lieutenant of Monmouthshire – Thomas Morgan
Lord Lieutenant of Cardiganshire – Wilmot Vaughan, 3rd Viscount Lisburne
Lord Lieutenant of Carmarthenshire – George Rice
Lord Lieutenant of Denbighshire – Richard Myddelton
Lord Lieutenant of Pembrokeshire – Sir William Owen, 4th Baronet
Lord Lieutenant of Radnorshire – Howell Gwynne

Bishop of Bangor – John Egerton
Bishop of Llandaff – Richard Newcome
Bishop of St Asaph – Robert Hay Drummond
Bishop of St Davids – Anthony Ellys

Events
George Herbert, 2nd Earl of Powis, takes out a lease on Esgair-mwyn lead mine.
Hirwaun ironworks begins coke smelting.
Daines Barrington is appointed judge of the Merioneth, Caernarvonshire and Anglesey circuit (Court of Great Sessions).

Arts and literature

New books
John Dyer - The Fleece
Edward Evans - translation of S. Bourne's Catechism 
Elizabeth Griffith - A Series of Genuine Letters between Henry and Frances
Joseph Harris - An Essay Upon Money and Coins
Joshua Thomas - Tystiolaeth y Credadyn

Music
Elis Roberts - "Jeils"
William Williams (Pantycelyn) - Rhai Hymnau a Chaniadau Duwiol

Births
12 September - John Williams,  lawyer and writer on legal topics (died 1810)
date unknown - Thomas Foley, admiral (died 1833)
probable - Richard Jones, Ruthin priest and writer (died 1814)

Deaths
23 March - Thomas Herring, former Bishop of Bangor, 64
16 July - Richard Lloyd, politician, about 54
16 September - Savage Mostyn, naval officer, 40s 
December - John Dyer, poet, 56

References

Wales
Wales